Below is a list of newspapers in Estonia.

References

External links
 Digitised Estonian newspapers Selection of newspapers between 1821–1944 and Foreign Estonia newspapers since 1944

 List
Estonia
Newspapers